Daniel E. Toomey is a New Hampshire politician.

Education
Toomey earned a master's degree from the University of Massachusetts Lowell.

Career

Military career
Toomey served in the United States Air Force.

Professional career
Toomey previously served as a member of the New Hampshire House of Representatives from 1989 to 1991. On November 6, 2018, Toomey was elected to the New Hampshire House of Representatives where he represents the Hillsborough 32 district. Toomey assumed office on December 5, 2018. Toomey is a Democrat. Toomey endorses Bernie Sanders in the 2020 Democratic Party presidential primaries.

Personal life
Toomey resides in Nashua, New Hampshire. Toomey is married and has five children.

References

Living people
University of Massachusetts Lowell alumni
Politicians from Nashua, New Hampshire
Democratic Party members of the New Hampshire House of Representatives
20th-century American politicians
21st-century American politicians
Year of birth missing (living people)